The Belarusian Women's Volleyball 1st League is the most important Belarusian women's volleyball competition organized by the Belarusian Volleyball Federation (Bielorusskaia Federatsija Volejbola, BFV), it was established in 1992 just after the dissolution of the Soviet Union.

History
8 teams took part in division "A" of the highest league of the championship 2020/21.

List of Champions

References

External links
 Официальный сайт БФВ
 Призёры чемпионатов Белоруссии
  Belarusian 1st League. women.volleybox.net 

Belarus
Volleyball in Belarus
1st Belarusian League
Sports leagues established in 1992
1992 establishments in Belarus
Sports leagues in Belarus